Richard Johnson (born 19 December 1985) is an English professional rugby league footballer who played in the 2000s. He has played for the Bradford Bulls and on loan from the Bradford Bulls at Wollongong.

Playing career
Johnson was born in Oldham, Greater Manchester, England. He is one of three rugby playing brothers, who have all donned the Bulls shirt at Academy level. Richard joined Bradford Bulls straight from school and has been there for the last six years.

In 2007 he was honoured with the captaincy of the Under 21s.

Johnson made his début against Leeds Rhinos on 8 August 2008.

Johnson will spend 2009 season playing for Wollongong in Sydney.

Statistics

Club career

References

1985 births
Living people
Bradford Bulls players
English people of Welsh descent
English rugby league players
Rugby league wingers
Rugby league players from Oldham